Teofilo Bruni (Verona, 1569 - Vicenza, 1638 ) was an Italian mathematician and astronomer.

Life 

Born in Verona, he was a capuchin friar known by the name of Raffaele.
He wrote mainly about mathematics and astronomy, but he published a book about clocks and other tools based on mathematical concepts.

Works

References 

Italian mathematicians